Miracle on the Mountain: The Kincaid Family Story is a 2000 American drama television film directed by Michael Switzer, written by Dan Levine, and starring Patty Duke, William Devane. Natasha Melnick, Kaj-Erik Eriksen and Elisabeth Rosen. It aired on CBS on April 26, 2000.

Plot
A problematic and wealthy family travels to the mountains for a family celebration, but their private plane develops some troubles and crashes on an isolated and cold mountain. Now, the family must work together to survive the extreme wilderness conditions, including an avalanche.

Cast
 Patty Duke as Anne Kincaid
 William Devane as Tom Kincaid
 Natasha Melnick as Susan Kincaid
 Kaj-Erik Eriksen as Rick Kincaid
 Elisabeth Rosen as Carla Kincaid
 Armando Valdes-Kennedy as Charlie Sanchez
 Kevin McNulty as Dave
 Ingrid Torrance as Alexis
 William Sanderson as Helicopter Pilot
 Kene Holliday as Jack Calloway

Reception
Laura Fries from Variety gave the film a negative review, stating: "Keep moving folks. Nothing new to see here unless you haven’t gotten your fill of the jeopardy of the week. In fact, this latest family drama isn’t even based on a true story. Heck, it’s not even inspired by a real incident. "Miracle on the Mountain" is touted by CBS as a movie "suggested by actual events." At this point, you might as well just admit it's fiction, and not particularly good fiction at that.". David Parkinson from Radio Times gave the film two out of five stars, concluding: "Director Michael Switzer makes the most of the scenery and stages an impressive avalanche, but the domestic duelling rapidly becomes wearisome."

References

External links
 
 
 Miracle on the Mountain: The Kincaid Family Story at Variety
 Miracle on the Mountain: The Kincaid Family Story at TCM
 Miracle on the Mountain: The Kincaid Family Story at Radio Times

2000 television films
2000 films
2000 drama films
2000s American films
2000s English-language films
2000s survival films
American drama television films
American survival films
Avalanches in film
CBS network films
Films about aviation accidents or incidents
Films about dysfunctional families
Films about vacationing
Films directed by Michael Switzer
Films scored by David Mansfield